The Hambantota Refinery (also called Greenfield Oil Refinery) is an oil refinery to be developed in Mirijjawila, Hambantota, in the Southern Province of Sri Lanka. The  refinery will be built and owned by Singapore's  (70%) and Oman's Ministry of Oil and Gas (30%). Silver Park International is an investment vehicle owned by India's Accord Group.

Construction of the first phase will commence on 24 March 2019 at a groundbreaking ceremony in the Mirijjawila Export Processing Zone, with Prime Minister Ranil Wickremesinghe attending as chief guest, with the project slated for completion in 44 months.

However, CEYPETCO and Lanka IOC could bid for refined petroleum products at competitive prices to supply to local consumers.

Storage and export 
Under construction first phase,   will be assigned to construct the oil terminal, pipeline, and other infrastructure.

Exports from the refinery will be channelled through the now Chinese-owned Hambantota Port, which has been mostly idle for nearly a decade since being built. The port, initially state-owned, has been leased to China in 2017 for 99 years, after Sri Lanka was unable to service a loan from Beijing.

History 
 In September 2017, Sri Lanka engaged in talks with two Chinese companies for a $3 billion refinery in Hambantota.
 During President Maithripala Sirisena's official visit to Tehran, cabinet spokesman Rajitha Senaratne stated that Iran has agreed to build a refinery and will send a team for assessments.
 19 March 2019, Sri Lanka confirms  refinery with Singapore's  and Oman's Ministry of Oil and Gas.
 21 March 2019, Oman denies ever being aware of the  refinery deal. Director General of Sri Lanka's state-run Board of Investment, Champika Malalgoda, then stated that the project would still go ahead, although without clarification on this situation or how the missing investment would be covered.

See also 
 Energy in Sri Lanka

References 

Buildings and structures in Hambantota District
Oil refineries in Sri Lanka